Fallen Angels is an American neo-noir anthology television series that ran from August 1, 1993 to November 19, 1995 on the Showtime pay cable station and was produced by Propaganda Films. No first-run episodes were shown in 1994.

The series was executive produced by Sydney Pollack and produced by Steve Golin and others. The theme song was written by Elmer Bernstein and the original music was written by Peter Bernstein.

Period torch songs by performers like Patti Page and Billie Holiday were used periodically.

In Europe, the show is known as Perfect Crimes and shown in France on Canal +, and in the United Kingdom.

Series overview
The series is set in somber Los Angeles, after World War II and prior to the election of American president John F. Kennedy.

The episodes, although filmed in color, mimicked what had been done by Hollywood filmmakers during the film noir era of the 1940s and 1950s in terms of tone, look, and story content.

The television program was produced using top-notch directors, well-known hard-boiled fiction writers, experienced screenplay writers, inventive cinematographers (who recreated the film noir images), and actors. The art direction gave the series the ambiance and historical look required of a show devoted to noir set in Los Angeles.

A few known actors went behind the camera to direct a few episodes. They include: Tom Cruise, Tom Hanks, and Kiefer Sutherland.

Each episode in season 1 begins with a cool and restrained jazz score as the sultry character Fay Friendly (Lynette Walden) explained to the audience what would develop in the episode. Each episode in season 2 begins with a prologue voiced by Miguel Ferrer which explained to the audience the episode's events and who the main characters were.

Neo-noir novelist James Ellroy said of the show: "It's a roll call of tormented souls confronting their monsters within; it's a picaresque look at Los Angeles back in the forties. It's the world of pulp on celluloid, pure translations that augment the stark power of great short fiction."

Crew

Directors:
 Peter Bogdanovich
 Tom Cruise
 Alfonso Cuarón
 John Dahl
 Keith Gordon
 Tom Hanks
 Agnieska Holland
 Tim Hunter
 Phil Joanou
 Jonathan Kaplan
 Michael Lehmann
 Jim McBride
 Steven Soderbergh
 Kiefer Sutherland

Writers:
 Jon Robin Baitz
 Scott Frank
 Steven Katz
 Don Macpherson
 C. Gaby Mitchell
 Frank Pugliese
 Howard A. Rodman
 Allan Scott
 David Siegel & Scott McGehee
 Amanda Silver
 Alan Trustman
 Richard C. Wesley
 Donald E. Westlake

Guest stars
Among the many guest stars on the show were:

First Season (1993)
 Gary Oldman, Gabrielle Anwar, Dan Hedaya, Wayne Knight and Meg Tilly
 Tom Hanks, Marg Helgenberger, Jon Polito and Bruno Kirby
 Joe Mantegna, Vinessa Shaw, Patrick Breen, J.E. Freeman, Kathy Kinney, Peter Gallagher and Bonnie Bedelia
 Peter Gallagher, Nancy Travis, John C. Reilly and Isabella Rossellini
 Laura Dern, Alan Rickman, Robin Bartlett, Michael Vartan and Diane Lane
 Gary Busey, Tim Matheson, David Bottomley, Aimee Graham, Dick Miller, Elaine Hendrix, Ken Lerner and James Woods

Second Season (1995)
 Mädchen Amick, Johnathon Schaech, Danny Trejo, Edward Bunker and Kiefer Sutherland
 Brendan Fraser, Bruce Ramsay and Peter Coyote
 Eric Stoltz, Richard Portnow, Estelle Harris and Jennifer Grey
 Dana Delany, Marcia Gay Harden, William Petersen, Adam Baldwin and Benicio del Toro
 Bill Pullman, Dan Hedaya, Kim Coates, Jon Favreau, Dean Norris, Jack Nance, Bert Remsen, Grace Zabriskie and Heather Graham
 Miguel Ferrer, Grace Zabriskie, Lucinda Jenney, Peter Dobson  and Peter Berg
 Michael Rooker, Laura San Giacomo, Peter Berg, Arnold Vosloo, Kristin Minter, Darren McGavin and Christopher Lloyd
 Danny Glover, Kelly Lynch, Ron Rifkin, Dan Hedaya, Miguel Sandoval  and Valeria Golino
 Bill Nunn, Giancarlo Esposito, Cynda Williams and Roger Guenveur Smith

Episodes

Season 1 (1993)

Season 2 (1995)

Reprints
Stories from the second season are reprinted in various volumes:
 "Flypaper" in The Big Knockover, and several Hammett collections.
 "Dancing Detective" in the Ibooks edition of Rear Window.
 "Professional Man" published in New Crimes, edited by Maxim Jakabowski.
 "No Escape!" published in As Tough as they Come, edited by Will Oursler.
 "Tomorrow I Die" in A Century of Noir.
 "Red Wind," in several Chandler collections.

Reception
When it debuted, Fallen Angels received mixed to critical notices. In his review for the Associated Press, Scott Williams wrote, "We're asking a lot of TV to deliver entertainment about that stylish, moral abyss. Fallen Angels delivers. It lets us look over the edge and measure our souls against the darkness". The Chicago Sun-Times gave the series two out of four stars and Ginny Holbert wrote, "Part of the problem is the series' arch, self-conscious obsession with style. Instead of a '90s interpretation of film noir, "Fallen Angels" offers contrived, full-color cliche noir, replete with cocked fedoras, plumes of curling smoke and harsh sunlight sliced by venetian blinds". In his review for The New York Times, John J. O'Connor called it, "uneven but diverting, even when just hovering around film-school level". In his review for the Houston Chronicle, Louis B. Parks wrote, "The big problem with film noir homages is they usually overdo the ingredients, with none of the subtlety of the great originals. Fallen Angels has a touch of that. But the directors and actors play straight, and the adaptations, taken from the real McCoy writers, are pretty good stuff". In his review for The Washington Post, Tom Shales wrote, "Creating period pieces out of their period seems to be fairly easy now for the gifted artisans of Hollywood. Even by today's commonplace high standards, however, the look and feel of the six Fallen Angels films seem transportingly authentic and sensuous, stylized in ways that evoke the milieu without spoofing it. Occasionally, the films veer into the arch and ridiculous, but overall, they at least look darn good". Newsweek magazine's David Gates wrote, "no show this summer will do a better job of whisking you away from the increasingly unacceptable '90s. These half hours are all too short". Entertainment Weekly magazine's Lisa Schwarzbaum wrote, "One unintended result of all this happy, naughty cigarette-puffing, however, is that, at their weakest, these films look like the work of boys (and don't be fooled, this is a boys' fantasy production) dressed up in their dads' big suits".

Home media
In the United States the first season was released in a two volume VHS set. The second season was released in Europe (DVD region 2) in 1999 and Australia (DVD region 4) under the title Perfect Crimes.

Other media
Grove Press released a companion book, Six Noir Tales Told for Television, (1993) with all the original stories and the screenplays from the first season. A soundtrack was also released.

References

External links
 .
 Fallen Angels at Thrilling Detective Guide
 Fallen Angels  cinematography article at Entertainment Weekly
 Fallen Angels film clip at YouTube ("Dead End for Delia" segment)

1990s American anthology television series
1993 American television series debuts
1995 American television series endings
Neo-noir television series
Showtime (TV network) original programming
Television series by CBS Studios
Television series by Universal Television
Television series set in the 1940s
Television series set in the 1950s
Television shows set in Los Angeles